The Impossible: The Miraculous Story of a Mother's Faith and Her Child's Resurrection is a non-fiction biography written by American author Joyce Smith, alongside contributor Ginger Kolbaba. The book, released on November 7, 2017, tells the story of Joyce's 14-year-old son John, who fell through icy Lake Sainte Louise, the smaller of two lakes in the community of Lake St. Louis, Missouri.

Film adaptation 
In 2018, 20th Century Fox announced plans to produce a movie adaptation of The Impossible, titled Breakthrough, working with director Roxann Dawson, executive producer Samuel Rodriguez and producer DeVon Franklin, who has worked on other faith drama titles such as Miracles from Heaven and Heaven Is for Real. The film was released on April 17, 2019.

In March of 2018, it was announced that actor Topher Grace would star as Pastor Jason Noble, and first responder Tommy Shine would  be portrayed by Mike Colter. Actress Chrissy Metz of NBC's This Is Us starred as Joyce Smith. Other lead roles include Josh Lucas, Sam Trammell, and Marcel Ruiz.

References

External links 
 

2017 non-fiction books
American non-fiction books
Evangelical Christian literature
Books about near-death experiences
Children and death
Non-fiction books adapted into films